Jardine House, formerly known as Connaught Centre, is an office tower in Hong Kong. The building is located at 1 Connaught Place, Central on Hong Kong Island. It is owned by Hongkong Land Limited, a subsidiary of Jardines. At the time of its completion in 1973, Jardine House was the tallest building in Hong Kong and in Asia. In 1980, the Hopewell Centre usurped the title of the tallest building in Hong Kong. The building is interconnected by the Central Elevated Walkway with buildings of Hongkong Land Limited like Exchange Square and the International Finance Centre.

There is also another Jardine House in Hamilton, Bermuda, which serves as the registered office for Jardines' Bermuda-domiciled businesses (most of Jardines' businesses including Jardine Matheson Holdings and Hongkong Land are incorporated and domiciled in Bermuda).

History

Previous Jardine Houses
The first three generations of Jardine Houses were situated at 20 Pedder Street, at the corner of Des Voeux Road Central. The first Jardine House was probably built around 1841 after Jardine's successful bid for its lots on The Praya Central. In 1908, the second Jardine House was built. It was rebuilt in around 1956 as a 16-storey building. The building was sold by Jardines during the land acquisition exercise of the Landmark complex in Central and 20 Pedder Street is now occupied by the Wheelock House.

New Jardine House

The new building was constructed on a piece of reclaimed land, under a lease term of 75 years, which was secured by Hongkong Land Limited at a record price of HK$258 million in 1970, payable interest free over a period of 10 years. In exchange, the Government agreed that no building directly to the north of Jardine House would ever be built to obstruct its views. Building costs were estimated at $120 million. Construction of the fifty-two-storey building took 16 months. Metal lettering from the Old Jardine House was salvaged and used in the lobby of the New Jardine House.

Design 
The building is constructed with a metal frame, and a curtain wall with round windows. The thickness of the structural frame is reduced because of the shape of the windows.

Unusually for a Jardine property, elevators were produced by Otis Elevator (was the fastest in Asia at the time of opening, one bank reaching speeds of ), while escalators were manufactured by Schindler Elevator (Jardine was and is still Schindler Elevator's partner in Asia). Schindler would modernize the elevators later in the mid-2000s.

The circular design of the windows has earned the building the nickname, "The House of a Thousand Arseholes."

In popular culture
Jardine House was prominently displayed in the 1988 NBC television miniseries Noble House as the headquarters for Struan's in a subtle nod to James Clavell using Jardines as a model for Struan's. It also appeared in establishing shots in The Amsterdam Kill, and was climbed by a giant gorilla in the climax of The Mighty Peking Man (1977). The building was also featured in the 1978 episode titled "The Chinese Web" of The Amazing Spider-Man TV series.

Gallery

See also
 Timeline of tallest buildings in Hong Kong

References

External links 

Jardine House, Hong Kong Land website
Pictures of Jardine House at skyscraperphotos.com
Gwulo entry with details about the early Jardine Houses

Skyscraper office buildings in Hong Kong
Central, Hong Kong
Hongkong Land
Office buildings completed in 1973
1973 establishments in Hong Kong